Gentian is an unincorporated community in Marquette County in the U.S. state of Michigan.  The community is located within Sands Township.  As an unincorporated community, Gentian has no legally defined boundaries or population statistics of its own.

History
Gentian was named from the fringed gentian flowers growing near the town site.

References

Unincorporated communities in Marquette County, Michigan
Unincorporated communities in Michigan